Boris Kushner may refer to:

 Boris Kušner (1888–1937), Russian poet art critic and political activist
 Boris Kushner (mathematician) (1941–2019), Russian poet and mathematician